Juan Manuel Garcia Passalacqua (February 22, 1937 – July 2, 2010) was a lawyer, writer and political analyst from Puerto Rico.

Early years
Garcia Passalacqua, who was born in the Hato Rey district of San Juan, Puerto Rico, showed interest in studying from a very young age, and he held degrees from Tufts, Tulane and Harvard universities. His father was a professor of literature at the University of Puerto Rico and his uncle was a candidate for governor for the Puerto Rican Independence Party. After obtaining his law degree, he went on to work as aide to governors Luis Muñoz Marín and Roberto Sanchez Vilella, both of the PPD. He was a member of a reformist group, known in Puerto Rico as The 22.

Writer and political analyst
Garcia Passalacqua later showed discontent with the PPD, eventually leaving the party. He became a television producer in Puerto Rico; one of his most important shows was Cara a Cara Ante el País (Face to Face). During the 1980s, Garcia-Passalacqua became one of the most sought after political analysts by other television producers. He became a common figure on Puerto Rican television during election years.

He wrote more than 20 books, in both Spanish and English, mostly on Caribbean affairs and politics. In 1982, he was invited to become a member of the Council on Foreign Relations. He was also a member of the Ambassadors Circle of the Carter Center in Atlanta. As part of his duties with the Carter Center, he served as an impartial election observer in more than a dozen countries around the world.

He taught classes as a visiting professor at colleges ranging from Yale University to the Center for Advanced Studies in Puerto Rico and the Caribbean in San Juan. For many years he served as legal counsel for the Ana G. Mendez Foundation. In his role as a political analyst in Puerto Rico, Garcia-Passalacqua was known to give his opinion or criticism of Puerto Rican parties without particularly lining up with or against any of the three major parties there. Over the years, he consistently proposed an associated republic political relationship between Puerto Rico and the United States since he wrote his masters thesis on the topic in 1957 for Professor Carl Friedrich at Harvard University. He wrote columns for such newspapers as El Nuevo Dia (The New Day), El Vocero (The Spokesperson) and The San Juan Star. In 2006, he returned to Puerto Rico's most respected news radio station, WKAQ, as an on-air political commentator.

"Juan Ma", as he was referred by some, participated in a televised program called Medio Día Puerto Rico (Midday Puerto Rico), during the lunchtime hours on Televicentro Puerto Rico in a segment called "La Escuelita" (The Small Schoolhouse). After an incident in which he apparently made mention of the daughter of Aníbal Acevedo Vilá (governor of Puerto Rico at the time), he was fired from the show and did not visit the TV station again, only talking via phone from outside when several people, such as La Comay or news reporters, called him for political analysis.

Later years
In early 2009, García Passalacqua reduced his level of activities for health reasons and began to be the object of published testimonials.  In particular, Governor Luis Fortuño issued a proclamation declaring February 22, 2009 Juan Manuel García Passalacqua Day in recognition of his accomplishments in public service, academia, journalism and political analysis. Fortuño, a former neighbor of García Passalacqua, considered the political analyst one of his mentors in his formative years.  He later re-joined WKAQ-AM as a political analyst, suggesting that his health had improved.  However, on Friday, May 7, 2010 a letter from him was read on  WKAQ-AM noon program directed to news director Javier Cosme and the program's audience stating that he was leaving the program and the islands of Puerto Rico to be at peace in his remaining time, since he had been diagnosed with terminal liver cancer.  He resided at the Ohio home of his daughter Ivonne Marie García Acosta, a college professor, during the last months of his life, where he died surrounded by his family, according to his widow, professor and author Ivonne Acosta.  On July 2, 2010, García Passalacqua died in Mount Vernon, Ohio

Governor Fortuño declared three days of mourning, July 3, 5 and 6, during which the flags of Puerto Rico and United States will be flown at half-mast.  Flags are never flown at half-mast on Independence Day, even though Puerto Rico is an unincorporated territory.

See also

 List of Puerto Ricans
 List of television presenters/Puerto Rico
 Luis Francisco Ojeda

References

External links
 Puerto Rican Attorney, Historian & Analyst Juan Manuel García-Passalacqua, 73, Dies - video report by Democracy Now!

1937 births
2010 deaths
Puerto Rican journalists
Puerto Rican lawyers
Puerto Rican political journalists
American columnists
Political commentators
Puerto Rican radio personalities
People from San Juan, Puerto Rico
Tufts University alumni
Tulane University alumni
Tulane University Law School alumni
Harvard University alumni
People from Mount Vernon, Ohio
University of Puerto Rico faculty